Canan Bayram (born 11 February 1966) is a German lawyer and politician (Alliance 90/The Greens). She is a member of the 19th German Parliament (Bundestag).  She was a member of the House of Representatives of Berlin from 2006 to 2017, when she was directly elected to the Berlin-Friedrichshain-Kreuzberg – Prenzlauer Berg East electoral district in the 2017 federal election.  From 2017 until 2021, she was the only Alliance 90/Green member of parliament to hold a direct mandate rather than being elected from the party list.

Early life 
Bayram was born in Malatya, Turkey, and grew up in Germany in Nettetal and Brüggen. Later, she completed high school in Bonn and studied politics and law at the University of Bonn and passed her first law state exam.

Early career

After an internship and passing her second law state exam, Bayram worked as a jurist in various federal ministries. Since 2003, she has been a lawyer in Berlin-Friedrichshain with a focus on labour law and family law.

Political career

Career in state politics
Bayram started her political career by joining the Social Democratic Party in 1999.  In 2006 she was elected to the House of Representatives of Berlin in the district of Berlin-Friedrichshain, winning 28% of the vote in the district. She was a spokesperson for the SPD parliamentary caucus and a member of the Committee on Constitutional Affairs, Home Affairs, Security and Order, as well as the Committee on Economic Affairs, Technology and Women. In May 2009, she defected from the SPD and joined the Alliance 90/The Greens in the House of Representatives of Berlin.

Bayram was re-elected in the 2011 and 2016 Berlin elections in the district of Friedrichshain-Kreuzberg 5. She was the spokesperson for migration, integration and refugee policy as well as spokesperson for legal policy in the party. She was also a member of the Committee for Integration, Labor, Vocational Training and Social Affairs as well as the Committee on Home Affairs, Security and Order and the Committee on Legal Affairs, Constitutional Affairs, Consumer Protection and Anti-Discrimination. Her political priorities were labor market policy, family policy, and domestic and legal policy.

Member of  Parliament, 2017–present
On 28 February 2017, Bayram announced her candidacy to succeed federal Alliance 90/The Greens member of Bundestag Hans-Christian Ströbele. At a constituency meeting on 11 March 2017, she was nominated as the Green candidate for the Berlin-Friedrichshain-Kreuzberg – Prenzlauer Berg East electoral district for the 2017 German federal election. During the federal Alliance 90/The Greens convention in Berlin from 16 to 18 June 2017, Bayram was introduced to a wider national audience. In an introductory speech, Bayram sharply criticized the party's lead candidates Katrin Göring-Eckardt and Cem Özdemir.

In the September federal election, Bayram was directly elected to the Berlin-Friedrichshain-Kreuzberg – Prenzlauer Berg East electoral district with 26.3% of the vote. As with her predecessor in the district, Ströbele, Bayram was the only Alliance 90/The Greens member of Bundestag to be directly elected and not from the party list.

Bayram has since been a member of the Committee on Legal Affairs and Consumer Protection. In addition, she has been serving on the parliamentary body in charge of appointing judges to the Highest Courts of Justice, namely the Federal Court of Justice (BGH), the Federal Administrative Court (BVerwG), the Federal Fiscal Court (BFH), the Federal Labour Court (BAG), and the Federal Social Court (BSG).

In addition to her committee assignments, Bayram has been serving as deputy chairwoman of the Parliamentary Friendship Group for Relations with the Maghreb States. Since 2022, she has also been part of the German delegation to the Parliamentary Assembly of the Organization for Security and Co-operation in Europe.

Political stances 
After a conflict on Berlin's Riga Street, Bayram criticized the Berlin Police after residents had complained about the massive police presence. She was criticized in part by her own party for her statement that "the [police] harassed local residents".

Bayram advocates the rights of tenants and criticizes international real estate funds that she feels are only interested in return on investment.

Following the 2017 national elections, Bayram argued that "a Jamaica coalition would be seen as a West German coalition in the east," noting the losses all three parties – the Christian Democratic Union/Christian Social Union (CDU/CSU), Free Democratic Party (FDP), and the Green Party – had suffered in the East.

References

External links 

 
 Berlin Parliament Biography
 Alliance 90/The Greens page

Members of the Bundestag for Berlin
1966 births
Members of the Abgeordnetenhaus of Berlin
German women lawyers
Social Democratic Party of Germany politicians
Turkish emigrants to Germany
German politicians of Turkish descent
Naturalized citizens of Germany
Living people
People from Malatya
University of Bonn alumni
Members of the Bundestag 2021–2025
Members of the Bundestag 2017–2021
Jurists from Berlin
Members of the Bundestag for Alliance 90/The Greens
21st-century German women politicians
20th-century German lawyers
21st-century German lawyers